Asa John Lawrey Lees (1931 – 8 January 2008) was an Australian gymnast. He competed in eight events at the 1956 Summer Olympics.

References

1931 births
2008 deaths
Australian male artistic gymnasts
Olympic gymnasts of Australia
Gymnasts at the 1956 Summer Olympics
Place of birth missing